Earphoria is a live album by American alternative rock band The Smashing Pumpkins. It is the soundtrack of the band's Vieuphoria video. While the video has been widely available since its initial release, the CD was initially released as a limited number (under 1000) of promo copies in 1994, and was subsequently heavily bootlegged. In 2002, Vieuphoria was reissued on DVD and Earphoria finally earned a commercial release.

The CD contains the audio for all the performances in Vieuphoria, and includes extended versions of the music used in the video interludes. An exception is the performance of "Silverfuck" – Earphoria includes the tease of "Over the Rainbow" while Vieuphoria edits it out, possibly owing to prohibitive licensing costs.

Critical reception 
"While a live document of the Pumpkins' farewell tour would have been very palatable," opined Classic Rock, "this mix-and-match collection of (mainly) live material from the full breadth of their career is far more imaginative. It's also vastly superior to their previous odds-and-sods compilation Pisces Iscariot."

Track listing 
All tracks written by Billy Corgan, except where noted.

Personnel 

 Jimmy Chamberlin – drums
 Billy Corgan – vocals, guitar
 James Iha – guitar, vocals
 D'arcy Wretzky – bass guitar, vocals, percussion on "Mayonaise"

References 

Albums produced by Butch Vig
The Smashing Pumpkins live albums
1994 live albums
Virgin Records live albums